Peter Magnusson (born July 16, 1984) is a Swedish footballer. He has previously played professional for Djurgårdens IF, HJK Helsinki and Sandefjord Fotball.

Career
After playing for Vasalunds IF, Magnusson joined Djurgårdens IF in 2008. Earlier in his career, he had a brief spell at HTFF, the youth team of Hammarby which is one of Djurgården's major rivals. As a young talent in Hammarby Magnusson stated that he could never play for Djurgården or the other Stockholm rival AIK. Magnusson made his Allsvenskan debut for Djurgården on July 6, 2008 against Trelleborgs FF. He played a total of 24 matches for DIF as a centre-back mainly alongside Toni Kuivasto. Magnusson left Djurgården on February 17, 2010.

He signed for one year with HJK Helsinki just before the 2010 Veikkausliiga season started. He was recommended by former DIF players Aki Riihilahti and Toni Kuivasto. At the same time he played for HJK's feeder club Klubi-04. 28 February 2011 he signed a two years contract with Sandefjord Fotball, and played for the club in Adeccoligaen until he went to IK Brage on 7 August after struggling with getting into the starting eleven at Sandefjord.

References

External links

Stats at Veikkausliiga.com

1984 births
Living people
Swedish footballers
Vasalunds IF players
Djurgårdens IF Fotboll players
Helsingin Jalkapalloklubi players
Sandefjord Fotball players
IK Brage players
Allsvenskan players
Veikkausliiga players
Norwegian First Division players
Swedish expatriate footballers
Expatriate footballers in Finland
Expatriate footballers in Norway
Association football defenders
Klubi 04 players